During the 2006–07 English football season, Portsmouth competed in the FA Premier League.

Season summary
After several seasons of struggle in English football's top flight, Portsmouth enjoyed one of their best seasons in many years as they challenged for European qualification, ultimately falling short with a nonetheless creditable ninth-place finish.

Kit
The team kit was manufactured by German sportswear manufacturer Jako and sponsored by Japanese electronics company Oki.

Final league table

Results

Premier League

Players

First-team squad
Squad at end of season

Left club during season

Reserve squad
The following players did not appear for the first team this season.

Statistics

Appearances and goals

|-
! colspan=14 style=background:#dcdcdc; text-align:center| Goalkeepers

|-
! colspan=14 style=background:#dcdcdc; text-align:center| Defenders

|-
! colspan=14 style=background:#dcdcdc; text-align:center| Midfielders

|-
! colspan=14 style=background:#dcdcdc; text-align:center| Forwards

|-
! colspan=14 style=background:#dcdcdc; text-align:center| Players transferred out during the season

Transfers

In
  Glen Johnson -  Chelsea, season loan, 28 June
  Sol Campbell -  Arsenal, free, 8 August
  David James -  Manchester City, estimated £1,200,000, 11 August
  Nwankwo Kanu -  West Bromwich Albion, free,  17 August
  Ognjen Koroman -  Terek Grozny, loan, 22 August
  Andy Cole -  Manchester City, £500,000 rising to £1,000,000, 31 August
  Niko Kranjčar -  Hajduk Split, undisclosed, 31 August
  Roudolphe Douala -  Sporting CP, season loan, 31 August
  Djimi Traoré -  Charlton Athletic, undisclosed, 11 January
  Arnold Mvuemba -  Rennes, season loan, 11 January
  Lauren -  Arsenal, undisclosed, 18 January
  Manuel Fernandes -  Benfica, loan
  David Thompson -  Wigan Athletic, free, 2006

Out
  Sander Westerveld - released (later joined  Almería)
  Brian Priske -  Club Brugge, 25 July
  Svetoslav Todorov -  Wigan Athletic, season loan, 31 August
  David Thompson -  Bolton Wanderers, nominal fee, 31 January
  Manuel Fernandes -  Benfica, loan ended
  Grégory Vignal -  Lens, free
  Andy Griffin -  Stoke City, loan, September
  Vincent Péricard - released (later joined  Stoke City), 19 June
  Jhon Viáfara -  Southampton, undisclosed (estimated £750,000), 4 August
  Aleksandar Rodić - released (later joined  Litex Lovech)
  Aliou Cissé - released (later joined  Sedan)
  Collins Mbesuma -  Marítimo, season loan, July
  Emmanuel Olisadebe - contract terminated
  Andrea Guatelli - released
  Gary Silk - released (later joined  Notts County
  Ivica Mornar - contract terminated, September
  Dean Kiely -  Luton Town, month loan, 23 November
  Dean Kiely -  West Bromwich Albion, undisclosed, 30 January
  James Keene -  IF Elfsborg

Notes

References

Portsmouth F.C. seasons
Portsmouth